Sengbe is a chiefdom in Koinadugu District of Sierra Leone with a population of 22,458. Its principal town is Yogomaia.

References

Chiefdoms of Sierra Leone
Northern Province, Sierra Leone